The Khalsa Akhbar ( (Gurmukhi),  (Shahmukhi)), Lahore, was a weekly newspaper and the organ of the Lahore Khalsa Diwan, a Sikh society. Published from Lahore in the Punjabi language (Gurmukhi script), the newspaper was established in 1886 and functioned sporadically till 1905. Founded by Bhai Gurmukh Singh, a professor of Punjabi at the Oriental College, Lahore, who also established the Khalsa Press in Lahore, the paper was taken over by Giani Ditt Singh, a scholar and a poet.

History
The newspaper was published with effect from 13 June 1886 through the efforts of Bhai Gurmukh Singh from Lahore. It was a weekly newspaper of the Khalsa Diwan society being published in Lithography and in Gurmukhi script. Its first two editors were Giani Jhanda Singh Faridkot and Sardar Basant Singh. Later on, it was handed over to Giani Ditt Singh. The newspaper continued to be published until 1889. After this its publication stopped for sometime due to a legal suit filed by the Amritsari party regarding the publication of a play called Swapan.

It resumed publication again on 1 May 1893 with Giani Ditt Singh as its editor. An experienced scholar and an expert in debates and discussions, he entered into many heated debates with representatives of Arya Samaj.

Giani Ditt Singh was an excellent writer of Punjabi prose and poetry and wrote many of his editorials in verse. He was the right-hand man of Bhai Gurmukh Singh and one of the pillars of Singh Sabha Lahore. He died in 1901. After him, Sardar Maeeya Singh Ahluwalia became the editor of Khalsa Akhbar and continued till 1905. The newspaper ceased publication after the dissolution of Singh Sabha Lahore and due to some other reasons.

References

External links
Archived editions via Panjab Digital Library:
From 1 May 1893 
From 4 September 1893
From 18 January 1901

Defunct weekly newspapers
History of Sikhism
Sikhism in Lahore
Weekly newspapers published in India
Defunct newspapers published in India
Punjabi-language newspapers published in India
Mass media in Lahore
Publications established in 1886
Publications disestablished in 1905
1886 establishments in India